Wolfgang Herrmann may refer to:

 Wolfgang Herrmann (1904–1945), German librarian and member of the Nazi Party
 Wolfgang A. Herrmann (born 1948), German chemist and former President of the Technical University of Munich